

Sideman (or Sidemann) was a medieval Bishop of Crediton.

Sideman was elected to Crediton in 973. He died on 30 April or 1 May or 2 May in 977. According to Byrhtferth of Ramsey, Sideman was a protégé of Ælfhere, ealdorman of Mercia. The same source says that Edward the Martyr was fostered by Sideman for a time before Edward's father's death. He died at a Royal council held at Kirtlington in Oxfordshire in 977 and was buried at Abingdon Abbey in Berkshire (now Oxfordshire).

Citations

References

External links
 

Bishops of Crediton (ancient)
10th-century English bishops
977 deaths
Year of birth unknown